Guy Alexander Masterson (Mastroianni; born 10 August 1961) is a British actor, writer, theatre director, producer and playwright widely known for his solo theatre performances of Under Milk Wood, Animal Farm, and Shylock by Gareth Armstrong. He is a regular producer at the annual Edinburgh Fringe Festival and responsible for several of its most notable productions including Twelve Angry Men in 2003, The Odd Couple in 2005 and Morecambe in 2009 – which transferred to London's West End and won a Laurence Olivier Award for Best Entertainment.

Personal life 
Masterson was born in Hampstead, North London, to Carlo Libinick Mastroianni and Marian Mastroianni (née James). He attended Hadley Wood Primary School, Christ's Hospital School, Horsham. He then went on to Cardiff University where he obtained a Joint honours degree in Biochemistry and Chemistry. After graduating in 1982, he emigrated to Los Angeles, California where he took his first salaried job in Hotel & Restaurant Management with Hilton Hotels where he served, among other celebrities, O. J. Simpson and Nicole Brown Simpson and André the Giant.
He returned to the UK in 1989 and continued his professional career after studying for a year at the London Academy of Music and Dramatic Art (LAMDA).
In October 1998 his met Brigitta Scholz, a German actress/model living in Paris and they married in January 1999. Their first child, Indigo Scholz-Mastroianni, was born in September 1999. Their second child, Tallulah Scholz-Mastroianni, was born in June 2005.
The family resides in London.

Professional life 
In 1984, his great uncle, the actor Richard Burton, died and Masterson (then Mastroianni) was persuaded to attend an acting class. He enrolled at UCLA's Extension Drama Programme for two semesters before auditioning and winning his first leading role in the Equity Waiver musical The Wonderful World of Waiver! His first professional job was understudying the roles of both Mick and Aston in The Caretaker at the LA Theatre Center.

After performing in a number of plays in Los Angeles including The Elephant Man by Bernard Pomerance, The Yorkshire Tragedy - a disputed Shakespeare text, City Gents by Ron Hart The Private Ear & The Public Eye by Peter Shaffer he returned to London to study at LAMDA – The London Academy of Music and Dramatic Art – on the Postgraduate Course, graduating in 1990.

After a number of collapsed projects, he self-produced his first solo work – The Boy's Own Story by Peter Flannery in 1991, and toured to various schools and other small arts venues around the UK including the Chelsea Centre Theatre where he was seen by a major casting director who cast him in Cyrano de Bergerac with Robert Lindsay and Julian Glover. This played at the Theatre Royal, Haymarket in London's West End for nine months, during which Masterson committed Under Milk Wood by Dylan Thomas to memory for his 2nd solo performance. Under Milk Wood officially premiered at The Traverse Theatre in Edinburgh in February 1994 and was such a critical success that he was invited to present the show at the Assembly Rooms during the 1994 Edinburgh Fringe Festival.

During this period, he also directed a one-man show about the life of actor Richard Burton - Playing Burton by Mark Jenkins starring the Welsh actor Josh Richards which garnered much critical acclaim. Both Under Milk Wood and Playing Burton then achieved great success at the 1994 Edinburgh Fringe Festival, and transferred to Riverside Studios London, and from there, both shows toured around the UK for several years.

The success of Masterson's solo Under Milk Wood led to his adapting another great British classic for solo performance – Animal Farm by George Orwell, which premiered at the Traverse Theatre on Burns Night (25 January) 1995, and thence at the Assembly Rooms at the 1995 Edinburgh Fringe Festival, where the entire run sold out prior to its opening performance. Both Animal Farm and Under Milk Wood then toured extensively domestically and internationally for several years including major tours all over India (1996) and New Zealand (1997).

In 1996, Masterson directed a production of The House of Correction by Norman Lock for the Edinburgh Fringe and presented it at the Pleasance where it received a Stage Award for Best Actress for Beth Fitzgerald.

In 1997, Masterson presented a Kiwi production The Ballad of Jimmy Costello with Tim Balme at the Assembly Rooms Edinburgh Fringe Festivalwhere he also presented Playing Burton, Bye By Blackbird by Willard Simms and Shylock by Gareth Armstrong. All the shows were critically successful with each artiste garnering a Stage Award nomination for Best Actor or Actress.

His early years at the Edinburgh Fringe Festival were followed by appearances & presentations over the subsequent 26 festivals where he, through his company, Theatre Tours International , presented over 150 more shows, mostly at the Assembly Rooms, but also at The Pleasance and the Traverse Theatre. Many of these productions were co-presentations with international companies of great repute, and their multiple and varied award nominations enhanced Masterson's own reputation as a producer of renown.

In 1998, his co-presentation of Skin Tight by New Zealand writer Gary Henderson won a Scotsman Fringe First Award.

In 1999, his co-presentation of Krishnan's Dairy with the New Zealand actor/writer Jacob Rajan won a Scotsman Fringe First Award and a Stage Best Actor nomination for Rajan. Linda Marlowe also received a Stage Best Actress Award Nomination for Berkoff's Women. Masterson also directed Pip Utton's Adolf which was one of the biggest hits of the Fringe that year and subsequently became one of the most successful solo shows of all time.

In 2000, Masterson introduced the work of the eminent New York writer/director John Clancy – a founder member of the New York International Fringe Festival, to the Edinburgh Fringe Festival where his production of Americana Absurdum by Brian Parks won a Scotsman Fringe First Award, as did Masterson's co-production of New Zealand writer Toa Fraser's Number Two. Stage Award nominations for Best Actress were also received by Madeleine Sami (for Number Two) and Jules Leyser for All Words For Sex which Masterson directed. This subsequently played at London's Soho Theatre.

2001 saw Masterson present 8 shows at the Edinburgh Fringe including his own performance of a compilation of Dylan Thomas short stories and poems Fern Hill & Other Dylan Thomas  for which Masterson received the Stage Best Actor award. A nomination was also received for Pip Utton's Resolution  which Masterson directed.

2002, Masterson presented 10 shows at the Edinburgh fringe co-presenting 4 with John Clancy including Horse Country by C.J. Hopkins; Cincinnati by Don Nigro; Goner by Brian Parks and The Complete Lost Works of Samuel Beckett As Found in an Envelope Marked 'Never To Be produced, Never, Ever, Ever, Or I'll Sue, I'll Sue From The Grave by Theater Oobleck and the Neo-Futurists. This programme of work won two Scotsman Fringe First awards for Horse Country & Cincinnati The Scotsman Best of the Firsts award for Horse Country; The Jack Tinker Spirit of the Fringe Award for Nancy Walsh-Clancy; The Herald Angel award; Horse Country, The Stage Best Actor Award for David Calvitto for Horse Country, and Stage Award Best Actress nomination for Nancy Walsh-Clancy for Cincinnati.

2003 saw Masterson create the first of three biggest theatre successes at the Edinburgh Fringe. 12 Angry Men by Reginald Rose, an all comedian revival at the Assembly Rooms including Bill Bailey as Juror 4, Phil Nichol as Juror 10, Owen O'Neill as Juror 8, Stephen Frost as Juror 3 and Russell Hunter as Juror 9 during the Edinburgh Fringe Festival which broke the existing box office record for drama at the Fringe and garnered much critical acclaim. This production won The Strathmore Audience Award and a nomination for The Stage Awards Best Ensemble. Masterson also received a Stage Award Nomination for Best Actor for his solo Under Milk Wood.

In 2004, Masterson originated a production of Dale Wasserman's One Flew Over The Cuckoo's Nest (play) starring Christian Slater and Mackenzie Crook but was forced to step-down from the production due to ill-health prior to opening. The show went on to break box office records at the Edinburgh Fringe Festival, two West End runs, and a Number One U.K. tour with Shane Richie. Masterson's acclaimed production of 12 Angry Men was invited to Perth International Arts Festival, Adelaide Festival and New Zealand Festival of the Arts where it sold every ticket. Masterson later remounted the production with Arts Projects Australia and Adrian Bohm with an all star Australian cast at QPAC Brisbane, Sydney Theatre and Melbourne Athenaeum including Shane Bourne as Juror 3, Peter Phelps as Juror 4, Marcus Graham as Juror 8, George Kapiniaris as Juror 2 and Henri Szeps as Juror 9. This production won three 2005 Melbourne Green Room Awards and a nomination for Best Play at the national Helpmann Awards.

In 2005, Masterson directed the most successful ever theatre production at the Edinburgh Fringe Festival, The Odd Couple by Neil Simon starring comedians Bill Bailey, Alan Davies, Phil Nichol, Owen O'Neill, Dave Johns, Ian Coppinger, Katherine Jakeways and Lizzie Roper. This production sold a capacity 850 seats a day at the Assembly Hall for the full run of the Festival.

In 2006, Masterson directed comedian Rich Hall's first stage play Levelland in which Hall played an irascible left-wing shock-jock. The show played at Melbourne Comedy Festival and Edinburgh Fringe Festival. Masterson also presented his solo Under Milk Wood at Union Hall, Adelaide to great acclaim.

In 2007, his production of Follow Me  by Ross Gurney-Randall and Dave Mounfield, won a Herald Angel, an Argus Angel and another Stage Award Best Actress nomination for Beth Fitzgerald.

In 2008, he directed Justin Butcher in his performance of his own Scaramouche Jones which sold out its run at the Assembly Rooms and embarked on a national tour. He also produced and directed Suzie Miller's first U.K. play, Reasonable Doubt  also at the Assembly Rooms, Edinburgh.

In 2009, he produced and directed Morecambe by Tim Whitnall which won a Scotsman Fringe First, a Stage Award nomination for Best Solo Performance, and went on to appear at the Royal Variety Performance and open at the Duchess Theatre in London's West End where it was nominated for a What's on Stage Award for Best Play, ITC Award for Best Touring Production, two Laurence Olivier Awards for Best Entertainment (Winner) and Best Performance in a Musical or Entertainment. The show then toured over 250 performances around the United Kingdom.

In 2011, Masterson remounted and performed his 1997 production of Shylock  directed by the author Gareth Armstrong. This won Masterson his 5th Stage Award nomination, this time for Best Solo Performance at the Edinburgh Fringe Festival.

In 2014, Masterson directed an epic 40 actor production of his own adaptation of Animal Farm  with Tumanishvili Film Actors Theatre Company of Tbilisi (Georgia) which won The Stage Award 2014 for Best Ensemble at the Edinburgh Fringe Festival. He also compiled and performed a WW1 Commemorative show Anthem For A Doomed Youth  which toured the UK around Remembrance Day and produced Bill Clinton Hercules , a bio-play about Bill Clinton by Rachel Mariner.

In 2015, Masterson collaborated with Hannah Ellis, granddaughter of Dylan Thomas to produce Dylan Thomas - The Man, The Myth *. He also adapted and performed a cut down 65 minute version of Under Milk Wood entitled Under Milk Wood - Semi Skimmed.

In 2016, Masterson collaborated with poet Clair Whitefield on Chopping Chillies . He also wrote and performed his own stand-up comedy show, Love & Canine Integration (later retitled Barking Mad! ) which then toured to Australia.

In 2017, Masterson collaborated with, produced & directed Michael Brandon (Dempsey & Makepeace) at Edinburgh Fringe Festival to great acclaim. For the festival season he opened his 11th solo work, Charles Dickens' A Christmas Carol  adapted and directed by Nick Hennegan.

In 2018, Masterson presented a WW1 Commemorative Season at the Adelaide Fringe Festival bannered Lest We Forget. At Edinburgh 2018, his 25th consecutive Fringe, Masterson presented a controversial new play purporting to reveal the truth behind the death of Marilyn Monroe The Marilyn Conspiracy , co-written with Vicki McKellar, to critical acclaim.

In 2019, Masterson collaborated with actor/writer Ian Shaw - son of actor Robert Shaw - and writer Joseph Nixon, to present and direct The Shark Is Broken - a play about the making of Jaws. The show was the hit of the 2019 Edinburgh Fringe and was subsequently picked up by Sonia Friedman Productions for a West End transfer in May 2020, but postponed due to the Covid Pandemic.

In 2021, Masterson presented a truncated season of Under Milk Wood - Semi Skimmed at Assembly Festival, his 27th consecutive Edinburgh Fringe (excluding 2020). In October 2021, The Shark is Broken  finally opened at the Ambassadors Theatre, London to widespread critical acclaim.

References

1961 births
Living people
People from Hampstead
People educated at Christ's Hospital
Alumni of Cardiff University
English male stage actors
English theatre directors
English theatre managers and producers
English people of Italian descent